"Social Currency" is a song recorded by Australian indie rock band Children Collide. It was the lead single from the band's debut album, The Long Now. It placed at No. 104 in the Triple J Hottest 100 of 2008.

Track listing

References

Children Collide songs
2008 singles
Song recordings produced by Dave Sardy
2008 songs